John Valentine Bara (November 26, 1926 – November 23, 2012) is a former member of the Ohio House of Representatives.

References

Members of the Ohio House of Representatives
1926 births
2012 deaths